The Huron Handicap was an American Thoroughbred horse race run between 1901 and 1940 at Saratoga Race Course in Saratoga Springs, New York. Raced on dirt, it was run at a distance of 1 3/16 miles (9.5 furlongs) with the exception of 1914 when the distance was set at 1 1/4 miles (10 furlongs).

Historical notes
The 1920 edition of the Huron Handicap saw William Coe's outstanding filly Cleopatra equal the track record in winning the race under future U.S. Racing Hall of Fame jockey Linus McAtee.
 While not a major event, the Huron nonetheless drew top horses and was won by other stellar runners such as Roamer, an American Horse of the Year and a U.S. Racing Hall of Fame inductee, The Finn, a 1915 Champion and Belmont Stakes winner, Johren who won the Latonia Derby and the Belmont Stakes, Sarazen, a two-time American Horse of the Year, plus both Whiskery and Reigh Count who each won the Kentucky Derby.

On August 25, 1938, the Huron Handicap was won by a female trainer for the first time in its history. Mary Hirsch, daughter of future U.S. Racing Hall of Fame inductee Max Hirsch, won the race with the colt Thanksgiving owned by another female, Anne Corning. Just 13 days earlier Mary Hirsch won the most important race of her career when she became the first female trainer to ever win the very prestigious Travers Stakes, also with Thanksgiving.

The final running on August 30, 1940 was won by Jacomar, a colt owned by "Cosmetics Queen" Elizabeth Arden. Previously, Jacomar had set a new Aqueduct track record on June 15 of 1:42 4/5 for 1 1/16 miles on dirt in winning the Shevlin Stakes.

The 1911–1912 statewide shutdown of horse racing
On June 11, 1908, the Republican controlled New York Legislature under Governor Charles Evans Hughes passed the Hart–Agnew anti-betting legislation. The owners of Saratoga Race Course, and other racing facilities in New York State, struggled to stay in business without income from betting. Racetrack operators had no choice but to drastically reduce the purse money being paid out which resulted in the Huron Handicap offering a purse in 1908 that was less than one-quarter of what it had been in earlier years. These small purses made horse racing unprofitable and impossible for even the most successful horse owners to continue in business. As such, for the 1909 and 10 racing seasons management of the Saratoga racing facility dropped some of its minor stakes races and used the purse money to bolster its most important events.

In spite of strong opposition by prominent owners such as August Belmont Jr. and Harry Payne Whitney, reform legislators were not happy when they learned that betting was still going on at racetracks between individuals and they had further restrictive legislation passed by the New York Legislature in 1910. The Agnew–Perkins Law, a series of four bills and recorded as the Executive Liability Act, made it possible for racetrack owners and members of its board of directors to be fined and imprisoned if anyone was found betting, even privately, anywhere on their premises.  After a 1911 amendment to the law that would limit the liability of owners and directors was defeated in the Legislature, every racetrack in New York State shut down. As a result, the Great Trial Stakes was not run in 1911 and 1912.

Owners, whose horses of racing age had nowhere to go, began sending them, their trainers and their jockeys to race in England and France. Many horses ended their racing careers there and a number remained to become an important part of the European horse breeding industry. Thoroughbred Times reported that  more than 1,500 American horses were sent overseas between 1908 and 1913 and of them at least 24 were either past, present, or future Champions. With a February 21, 1913 ruling by the New York Supreme Court, Appellate Division, horse racing and the Huron Handicap returned in 1913.

Records
Speed record:
 1:56.00 @ 9.5 Furlongs (1 3/16 miles) – Cleopatra (1920) & Maeda (1939)

Most wins by a jockey:
 2 – Walter Miller (1906, 1907)
 2 – James Butwell (1914, 1915)
 2 – Frank Robinson (1917, 1918)
 2 – Linus McAtee (1920, 1923)
 2 – Mack Garner (1922, 1929)
 2 – Sidney Hebert (1931, 1937)

Most wins by a trainer:
 3 – James G. Rowe Sr. (1917, 1918, 1923)

Most wins by an owner:
 3 – Harry P. Whitney (1917, 1918, 1927)

Winners

References

Flat horse races for three-year-olds
Discontinued horse races in New York (state)
Saratoga Race Course
Recurring sporting events established in 1901
Recurring sporting events disestablished in 1940
1901 establishments in Florida
1940 disestablishments in Florida